Karo Haghverdian (born January 11, 1945) is a retired Iranian Armenian football player.

Early life
Haghverdian started playing football at the age of 13 when he joined amateur side Gohar F.C. Under the guidance of coach Areshavir Yeritsian, Haghverdian developed into a star player for the team. However, his parents - worried about how his passion for football was affecting his schooling - cautioned Haghverdian to stop playing football and to concentrate on his studies instead. 

Going against his parents' wishes, Haghverdian continued to play. His performances on the pitch helped his team win several local championships.

Career
In 1963, Haghverdian was spotted by Ararat Tehran FC coach Garnik Mehrabian. Noticing his talent, Mehrabian immediately signed Haghverdian to a contract for the remainder of the season. Haghverdian continued to play for the team for three seasons, until he was spotted by Taj S.C. manager Zdravko Rajkov. Haghverdian spent 6 seasons with Taj S.C., in where he participated in a record 17 Tehran derbys against rival Persepolis F.C.

International
Haghverdian received 23 caps by the Iran national football team, scoring his only goal against Pakistan in the 1970 RCD Cup.

References

 کارو حقوردیان - جام تخت جمشید

External sources

Living people
1945 births
People from Tehran
Armenian footballers
Iranian footballers
Iranian people of Armenian descent
Iran international footballers
F.C. Ararat Tehran players
Esteghlal F.C. players
Asian Games gold medalists for Iran
Asian Games medalists in football
1968 AFC Asian Cup players
Footballers at the 1970 Asian Games
Footballers at the 1974 Asian Games
Association football midfielders
Medalists at the 1974 Asian Games